There are around 54 villages in Shrirampur taluka of Ahmednagar district of state of Maharashtra. Following is the list of village in Shrirampur taluka.

A
 Aklahre
 Ashoknagar

B
 Belapur Bk : 
 Belapur Kh
 Bhamathan
 Bherdapur -
 Bhokar
 Bramhangon vetal
 Bhairavnath nagar(Gondhawani)
 Babasahebnagar

D
 Dighi

F

 Fattyabad

G
 Galnib
 Gondegoan
 Gowardhan
 Gujarwadi
 Gumandev

H
 Haregon

J
 Jafarabad

K
 Kadit Bk
 Kadit kh.
 Kamalpur
 Kanhegoan
 Karegoan
 Khanapur
 Khandala
 Khirdi
 Khokar
 Kuranpur

L
 Ladgoan

M
 Mahankalwadgao
 Malewadi
 Malunja Bk
 Malwadgoan
 Mandve
 Matapur
 Matulthan
 Muthewadgao

N
 Naur
 Naygoan
 Nimgoan khairi
 Nipani Wadgoan

P
 Padhegaon

R
 Rampur - Kokare
 Ranjankhol

Shrirampur
 Sarla
  Shermale wasti
 Shirasgoan - Shirasgaon - Village Overview
                   Gram Panchayat :	gondegaon 
                   Block / Tehsil :	Shrirampur
                   District :	Ahmednagar
                   State :	Maharashtra
                   Pincode :	413739
                   Area :	1307 hectares
                   Population :	8,216
                   Households :	1,718
                   Nearest Town :	Shrirampur (5 km)

T
 Taklibhan
 Tilaknagar

U
 Umbargoan
 Ukkalgaon
 Undirgoan

W
 Wadala Mahadev
 Waladgoan
 Wangi Bk
 Wangi Khd
 wanjalgaon

See also
 Shrirampur taluka
 Talukas in Ahmednagar district
 Villages in Akole taluka
 Villages in Jamkhed taluka
 Villages in Karjat taluka
 Villages in Kopargaon taluka
 Villages in Nagar taluka
 Villages in Nevasa taluka
 Villages in Parner taluka
 Villages in Pathardi taluka
 Villages in Rahata taluka
 Villages in Rahuri taluka
 Villages in Sangamner taluka
 Villages in Shevgaon taluka
 Villages in Shrigonda taluka

References

 
Shrirampur